

List of ambassadors

Ziv Nevo Kulman 2021
Ilan Ben-Dov (diplomat) 2017 - 2021
Isaac Bachman 2012 - 2017
Benny Dagan 2008 - 2012
Eviatar Manor 2004 - 2008
Zvi Mazel 2002 - 2004
Eliyahu Avidan 1999 - 2002
Gideon Ben-Ami 1994 - 1999 
Amnon Ben-Yochanan 1990 - 1994
Moshe Yagar 1988 - 1990
Moshe Erell 1984 - 1988
Abraham Avidar 1980 - 1984
Mordecai Kidron  1977 - 1980
Abner Edan 1973 - 1976
Mesholam Veron 1969 - 1973
Ephraim Evron 1968 - 1969
Yaacov Shimoni 1964 - 1968
Moshe Bitan 1962 - 1964
Arie Aroch 1959-1962
Ambassador Chaim Yahil 1956 - 1959
Minister Avraham Nissan 1950 - 1956

References

Sweden
Israel